The Crystal Gazer is a lost 1917 American drama silent film directed by George Melford, and written by Eve Unsell, Edna G. Riley, and Marion Fairfax. The film stars Fannie Ward, Jack Dean, Winifred Greenwood, Harrison Ford, Raymond Hatton and Edythe Chapman. The film was released on July 30, 1917, by Paramount Pictures.

Plot

Cast 
Fannie Ward as Rose Jorgensen / Rose Keith / Norma Dugan
Jack Dean as The Great Glen Carter
Winifred Greenwood as Belle
Harrison Ford as Dick Alden
Raymond Hatton as Phil Mannering
Edythe Chapman as Mrs. Mannering
Jane Wolfe as Mrs. Dugan

References

External links 
 

1917 films
1910s English-language films
Silent American drama films
1917 drama films
Paramount Pictures films
Films directed by George Melford
American black-and-white films
Lost American films
American silent feature films
1917 lost films
Lost drama films
1910s American films